Phyllonorycter trifoliella is a moth of the family Gracillariidae. It is known from Estonia, Georgia, Latvia, Lithuania and the Krasnodar Region of Russia.

The larvae feed on Lathyrus roseus and Trifolium species. They mine the leaves of their host plant.

References

trifoliella
Moths of Europe
Moths described in 1933